Wolfgang Tiefensee (born 4 January 1955) is a German politician of the Social Democratic Party (SPD). He was the Federal Minister for Transport, Building and Urban Development in the grand coalition cabinet led by Angela Merkel between 2005 and 2009. Since 2014, he has been the State Minister of Economy, Science and the Digital Society in the government of Thuringia's Minister-President Bodo Ramelow.

Career
Originally an electrical engineer, Tiefensee turned to politics in 1989, during the democratization process of the German Democratic Republic. He became a member of the SPD in 1995.

Mayor of Leipzig, 1998–2005
Tiefensee was elected mayor of Leipzig in 1998, and was re-elected with 67.1% of the vote in April 2005. Before 2005, he declined offers of a position in the federal government, stating his place was in Leipzig.

As mayor, he put great effort into Leipzig's bid to host the 2012 Olympic Games. While Leipzig unexpectedly won the campaign to tender the German bid, the middle-sized city did not get past the first round of the international competition, which was in fact won by London.

In 2002, Tiefensee was part of the 15-member commission that developed the so-called Hartz reforms, a set of recommendations to reform the German labour market as part of chancellor Gerhard Schröder’s Agenda 2010. Later that year, following the 2002 federal elections, he declined Schröder’s offer to join his government.

Role in national politics
In 2007, Tiefensee chaired talks following which EU transport ministers agreed unanimously to end talks with a private consortium contracted to develop the Galileo satellite navigation system and to spend €2.4 billion ($3.2 billion) to build it themselves instead.

Also during his tenure as Germany's transport minister, Tiefensee announced the little-known architect Francesco Stella as the winner of a competition to find an architectural design for the controversial reconstruction of the Berlin Stadtschloss in 2008.

In 2012, Tiefensee succeeded Garrelt Duin as spokesperson of the SPD parliamentary group on economic affairs. In the negotiations to form a Grand Coalition of chancellor Angela Merkel's Christian Democrats (CDU together with the Bavarian CSU) and the SPD following the 2013 federal elections, he was part of the SPD delegation in the working group on economic policy, led by Ilse Aigner and Hubertus Heil.

Career in state politics
Tiefensee resigned from his seat in parliament when he became State Minister of Economy, Science and the Digital Society in the government of Thuringia's Minister-President Bodo Ramelow in 2014. As one of the state's representatives at the Bundesrat, he serves on the Committee on Cultural Affairs and on the Committee on Economic Affairs.

In early 2018, Tiefensee was elected chairman of the SPD in Thuringia, succeeding Andreas Bausewein. He was confirmed in the November 2018 party conference.

In May 2020, Tiefensee announced that he would not stand in the next Thuringian state election but instead resign from active politics by the end of the parliamentary term.

Other activities

Regulatory agencies
 Federal Network Agency for Electricity, Gas, Telecommunications, Post and Railway (BNetzA), Alternate Member of the Advisory Board (2009-2013), Member of the Advisory Board (since 2014)

Corporate boards
 Germany Trade and Invest (GTAI), Member of the Supervisory Board 
 Thüringer Aufbaubank (TAB), Ex-Officio Chairman of the Supervisory Board (since 2014)
 Landesentwicklungsgesellschaft Thüringen (LEG), Ex-Officio Chairman of the Supervisory Board (since 2014)
 Carl Zeiss Foundation, Ex-Officio Member of the Board (since 2014)
 KfW, Ex-Officio Member of the Supervisory Board (2005-2009)

Non-profit organizations
 Business Forum of the Social Democratic Party of Germany, Member of the Political Advisory Board (since 2018)
 Friedrich Ebert Foundation (FES), Member of the Board of Trustees
 Gegen Vergessen – Für Demokratie, Chairman (since 2012)
 German Association for Small and Medium-Sized Businesses (BVMW), Member of the Political Advisory Board
 Institute for Germany Studies (IDF), Ruhr University Bochum, Member of the Board of Trustees
 Wittenberg Center for Global Ethics, Member of the Board of Trustees
 Sepsis-Stiftung, Member of the Board of Trustees
 German Association for Small and Medium-Sized Businesses (BVMW), Member of the Political Advisory Board (2009-2015)

Personal life
Tiefensee, whose father was the musician and conductor Siegfried Tiefensee, is also known for playing the cello, a talent that he successfully incorporated into Leipzig's Olympic bid. His brother, is a Catholic priest and was professor of theology at the University of Erfurt from 1997 to 2018.

References

External links

1955 births
Living people
People from Gera
People from Bezirk Gera
German Roman Catholics
Ministers of the Thuringia State Government
Transport ministers of Germany
Construction ministers of Germany
Mayors of Leipzig
Members of the Bundestag for Saxony
Members of the Bundestag 2013–2017
Members of the Bundestag 2009–2013
Members of the Bundestag for the Social Democratic Party of Germany